Vulcan County is a municipal district in Alberta, Canada. Located in Census Division No. 5, its municipal office is located in the Town of Vulcan.

History 
Vulcan County was originally established in 1951.

Geography

Communities and localities 
The following urban municipalities are surrounded by Vulcan County.
Cities
none
Towns
Vulcan
Villages
Arrowwood
Carmangay
Champion
Lomond
Milo
Summer villages
none

The following hamlets are located within Vulcan County.
Hamlets
Brant
Ensign
Herronton
Kirkcaldy
Mossleigh
Queenstown
Shouldice
Travers

The following localities are located within Vulcan County.
Localities

Anastasia
Armada
Eyremore
Farrow

Majorville
Pageant
Peacock

Other places
Kinnondale
Waldeck

Demographics 

In the 2016 Census of Population conducted by Statistics Canada, Vulcan County had a population of 3,984 living in 1,180 of its 1,616 total private dwellings, a  change from its 2011 population of 3,875.

Vulcan County's 2012 municipal census counted a population of 3,893, a 0.5% increase over its 2007 municipal census population of 3,830.

See also 

List of communities in Alberta
List of municipal districts in Alberta
Little Bow Lake Reservoir

References

External links 

 
1951 establishments in Alberta
Municipal districts in Alberta
Populated places established in 1951